Cherupuzha is a tributary of Karimpuzha which is a tributary of Chaliyar river in Kerala, India. Cherupuzha originates from the south-western slopes of Mukurthi National Park in Nilgiris district of Tamil Nadu. It is a major water source for Nilambur South forest division. It joins with Karimpuzha near Karulai town.

Rivers of Malappuram district